Gage Quinney (born July 29, 1995) is an American professional ice hockey forward currently a free agent. Quinney is notable as the first Nevada-born player in NHL history, making his debut with hometown team, the Vegas Golden Knights.

Playing career
Quinney played as a youth with the Phoenix Jr. Coyotes and in his hometown with the Las Vegas Storm of the T1EHL. Showing offensive potential, Quinney was selected with 83rd overall in the 2011 USHL Futures draft by the Tri-City Storm before opting to play major junior hockey in Canada for the Prince Albert Raiders, Kelowna Rockets and Kamloops Blazers in the Western Hockey League (WHL).

Undrafted, he began his professional career in the 2016–17 season, signing an ECHL contract with the Wheeling Nailers on October 10, 2016. After producing at a point-per-game pace, Quinney began the following 2017–18 season with AHL affiliate, the Wilkes-Barre/Scranton Penguins. Continuing to play in a top-nine role, Quinney was able to continue his offensive output at the AHL level, contributing with 14 goals and 33 points in 57 games with Wilkes-Barre.

On June 2, 2018, Quinney was signed to his first NHL contract, agreeing to a two-year, entry-level contract with hometown club, the Vegas Golden Knights. After attending the Golden Knights 2018 training camp, Quinney was re-assigned to AHL affiliate, the Chicago Wolves for the 2018–19 season. Securing a forward role amongst the top-six with the Wolves, Quinney established new career highs with 19 goals and 24 assists for 43 points in 68 regular season games. He added 9 points in 18 post-season games, helping the Wolves reach the Calder Cup finals before losing to the Charlotte Checkers.

In the following 2019–20 season, Quinney continued on his assignment with the Chicago Wolves. He added 32 points in just 42 games before receiving his first recall to the NHL by the Golden Knights on February 21, 2020. Quinney became the first native Nevadan to play in a NHL game, making his debut with the Golden Knights against the Florida Panthers on February 22, 2020. He registered his first point, an assist, in his second game with the Golden Knights in a 6-5 overtime victory against the Anaheim Ducks on February 23, 2020.

As a free agent at the conclusion of his NHL contract, Quinney opted to continue within the Golden Knights' organization after agreeing to a one-year AHL contract with the Henderson Silver Knights on July 14, 2022.

Personal
His father, Ken Quinney, played hockey for the Las Vegas Thunder of the International Hockey League (IHL) from 1993 to 1998.

Career statistics

References

External links

1995 births
Living people
Chicago Wolves players
Henderson Silver Knights players
Kamloops Blazers players
Kelowna Rockets players
Prince Albert Raiders players
Undrafted National Hockey League players
Vegas Golden Knights players
Wheeling Nailers players
Wilkes-Barre/Scranton Penguins players